Chhoeun Rithy (born 1965) is a noted Cambodian artist best known for his art deco paintings on buildings and modernist structures in Phnom Penh.

Exhibitions
2005: "Identities versus Globalisation", Berlin, Germany.
2004: "Identities versus Globalisation", Bangkok, Thailand.
2004: "Identities versus Globalisation", Chiang Mai, Thailand.
2002: "Visions of the Future", Reyum, Phnom Penh, Cambodia.
2000: "Arts and Culture for Peace", Silpakon University, Bangkok, Thailand.
2000: "Modern Art" group exhibition, Sunway, Phnom Penh, Cambodia.
1998: "80 Anniversary of The Plastic Arts University" at the Royal University of Fine Arts, Phnom Penh, Cambodia.

References

External links
Saklapel.org

1965 births
Cambodian artists
Living people
20th-century Cambodian artists
21st-century Cambodian artists